The 2015 Red Bull Air Race of Fort Worth was the seventh round of the 2015 Red Bull Air Race World Championship season, the tenth season of the Red Bull Air Race World Championship. The event was held at the Texas Motor Speedway in Fort Worth, Texas.

Championship leader Paul Bonhomme took his fourth victory of the season, finishing 0.767 seconds ahead of title rival Matt Hall, while Yoshihide Muroya matched his best Air Race result, with a third-place finish. In the Challenger class, France's Mikaël Brageot took his second win in succession, 0.208 seconds ahead of Peter Podlunšek.

Master Class

Qualification

Round of 14

 Pilot received 2 seconds in penalties.
 Pilot received 3 seconds in penalties.

Round of 8

 Pilot received 2 seconds in penalties.
 Pilot received 4 seconds in penalties.

Final 4

Challenger Class

Results

Standings after the event

Master Class standings

Challenger Class standings

 Note: Only the top five positions are included for both sets of standings.

References

External links

|- style="text-align:center"
|width="35%"|Previous race:2015 Red Bull Air Race of Spielberg
|width="30%"|Red Bull Air Race2015 season
|width="35%"|Next race:2015 Red Bull Air Race ofLas Vegas
|- style="text-align:center"
|width="35%"|Previous race:2014 Red Bull Air Race ofFort Worth
|width="30%"|Red Bull Air Race ofFort Worth
|width="35%"|Next race:2016 Red Bull Air Race ofFort Worth
|- style="text-align:center"

Fort Worth
Red Bull Air Race World Championship
Red Bull Air Race World Championship, Fort Worth
2015 in sports in Texas